John Gunnar Björkengren (born 9 December 1998) is a Swedish professional footballer who plays as a midfielder for  club Brescia, on loan from Lecce.

Club career
On 18 January 2023, joined Brescia on loan with an option to buy.

References

1998 births
Living people
People from Falkenberg
Sportspeople from Halland County
Swedish footballers
Association football midfielders
Allsvenskan players
Superettan players
Serie A players
Serie B players
Falkenbergs FF players
U.S. Lecce players
Brescia Calcio players
Swedish expatriate footballers
Swedish expatriate sportspeople in Italy
Expatriate footballers in Italy